Monica Holler (born May 15, 1984, in Laxå) is a Swedish professional cyclist. She is part of the 2006 Bigla Cycling Team.

Notable results
2002
 3rd in World Road Race Championship, Juniors
2004
 1st in European Road Race Championship, Espoirs
 2nd in Tjejtrampet
 2nd in Swedish National Road Race Championship, Elite
2005
 2nd in Berner Rundfahrt
 2nd in Tjejtrampet
 2nd in Swedish National Time Trial Championship, Elite
 2nd in European Road Race Championship, Espoirs
 3rd in GP Ouest France
2006
 1st in Parel van de Veluwe
 2nd in Swedish National Road Race Championship, Elite
 3rd in European Road Race Championship, Espoirs
 3rd in Open de Suède Vårgårda
2007
 2nd in 2007 Omloop Het Volk

2012 – Sengers Ladies Cycling Team 2012 season

References

1984 births
Living people
Swedish female cyclists
People from Laxå Municipality
Sportspeople from Örebro County